Ignatius Antony II Hayyek (or Antun Hayek, September 14, 1910 – February 21, 2007) was the Patriarch of Antioch and all the East of the Syrians of the Syriac Catholic Church from 1968 to 1998.

Antun Hayyek was born at Aleppo in 1910 and was ordained priest on June 10, 1933. On August 15, 1959 he was consecrated bishop of Aleppo by Patriarch Ignatius Gabriel I Tappuni and served there till his appointment as Primate and Patriarch on March 10, 1968. His resignation was accepted on July 23, 1998. He died on February 21, 2007.

References

1910 births
2007 deaths
Syriac Catholic Patriarchs of Antioch
People from Aleppo
Participants in the Second Vatican Council
20th-century Eastern Catholic archbishops
Recipients of the Order of Saint Ignatius of Antioch
20th-century Syrian people
21st-century Syrian people